The 1914–15 Scottish Division One season was won by Celtic by four points over nearest rival Heart of Midlothian.

League table

Results

References

Scottish Football Archive

1914–15 Scottish Football League
Scottish Division One seasons
Scottish